Alemannia Aachen or ATSV Alemannia 1900 is a German football club from the western city of Aachen, North Rhine-Westphalia. A long term fixture of the country's second division, Alemannia enjoyed a three-year turn in the Bundesliga in the late 1960s and, after a successful 2005–06 campaign, returned to the first division for a single season. The club has since slipped to third division play and in late 2012 entered into bankruptcy. They finished their 2012–13 3. Liga schedule before resuming play in the tier IV Regionalliga West in 2013–14.

Alemannia carries the nickname "the potato beetles" (Kartoffelkäfer) because of their striped yellow-black jerseys, which make them look like the particular insects.

History

Foundation to World War II
In the second half of the 19th century, resident English workers and businessmen brought football, in addition to the traditional equestrian sports, into the western Rhineland. The club was founded on 16 December 1900 by a group of eighteen high school students. Knowing that another team had already taken the name 1. FC Aachen, the new club was christened FC Alemannia, using the Latin word for Germany (see Alamannia). The First World War devastated the club: the pre-war membership of 200 was reduced to a mere 37 by the conflict. In early 1919 Alemannia merged with local sports club Aachener Turnverein 1847 to become TSV Alemannia Aachen 1900. Their new partner's interest was primarily in gymnastics rather than football and as a result the union was short-lived, with the clubs splitting again in 1924.

The city of Aachen is very near the Belgian and Dutch borders and as a result Alemannia has had frequent contact with clubs from those countries. Their first game was against the Belgian side R. Dolhain F.C., one of that country's earliest clubs. There are intensive and friendly contacts with the Dutch professional club Roda JC Kerkrade. Both clubs have the same club colors.

The team played in the Rhineland-Westphalia FA and won its first championship there in 1907, before joining the newly formed Westdeutsche Fussball Verband in 1909. The club grew steadily as interest in football increased. They qualified for the Rheingauliga in 1921, built their own stadium in 1928, and earned admittance to the Oberliga the following year.

The club enjoyed some success in the early 1930s by advancing to the final four of the Westdeutsche championship playoffs. In 1933, German football was re-organized under the Third Reich into sixteen top-flight Gauligen. Alemannia played several seasons in the Gauliga Mittelrhein in the late 1930s and early 1940s. They finished top in their division in 1938 and advanced to the national final rounds. This was in spite of a protest by SV Beuel 06 which ultimately saw that club awarded the division championship, but too late to allow Beuel to play in the national playoff in Aachen's stead.

Alemannia is known as one of the few sports clubs of this era to offer any challenge to the Nazi regime's purge of Jews from the country's sports organizations by demanding the release of a jailed Jewish member.

Postwar and entry to the Bundesliga
In 1946, after World War II and the lifting of the ban placed by Allied occupation authorities on most types of organizations in Germany, Alemannia re-constituted itself and began play in second tier Rheinbezirk. They returned to first division play in the Oberliga West the next year, but ran into financial difficulty. They remained a steady, but unspectacular second division side, generally finishing mid-table.

Aachens first measure of success came with an advance to the DFB-Pokal final in 1953 where they lost a 1–2 decision to Rot-Weiss Essen.

After the formation of the Bundesliga, Germany's new professional football league, in 1963, Alemannia found themselves in Regionalliga West (II). In 1965, they had another good run in German Cup competition, earning another final appearance – but were once again unsuccessful – this time losing 0–2 to Borussia Dortmund.

The club captured their division in 1967 and were promoted to the Bundesliga (I) for the 1967–68 season. They enjoyed their best ever result the next year with a second-place finish behind champion Bayern Munich. However, the following season was a disaster: the team earned only one point in play away from home and toppled to an 18th-place finish. They returned to play in the Regionalliga West (II), and in 1990 fell still further to the third division.

Road to recovery

After several mediocre seasons in the second half of the 1990s, trainer Werner Fuchs rejuvenated the Alemannia squad by playing 4–4–2 without a libero (sweeper), creating a side that played an attractive, fluid offense. In 1999, the team played well and delivered an especially strong second half. They were atop the table, just weeks away from the end of the season, when tragedy struck with the unexpected death of Fuchs. The whole city was in shock, but the club managed to pull through, dedicating their promotion to their late trainer and winning the Regionalliga West/Südwest (III). The first years in the 2. Bundesliga were tough for Aachen, both on the field and financially. The club struggled for several seasons and the situation was worsened when financial irregularities were uncovered showing the club was near bankruptcy.

The turnaround came with a new executive board under president Horst Heinrichs, trainer Dieter Hecking and manager Jörg Schmadtke. Through improved financial management, shrewd player signings, and clever game tactics, Aachen became a power once again in the 2003–04 season. They played their way to their third DFB-Pokal final appearance, knocking off TSV 1860 Munich, Bayern Munich, and Borussia Mönchengladbach, before losing 2–3 to Bundesliga champions Werder Bremen. As league champions Bremen already held a place in the UEFA Champions League, thereby making room for Aachen to take part in the UEFA Cup competition. They delivered a decent performance, advancing to the Round of 32 before going out to eventual semi-finalists AZ Alkmaar. The club's participation in the German Cup and UEFA Cup play helped to significantly improve their financial situation.

Bundesliga and 2. Bundesliga
On 16 April 2006, Alemannia became the first team to earn promotion to the Bundesliga in 2005–06, ending Aachen's 36-year absence from top-flight football. However, they stayed up only a single season as they took only one point from their last eight matches of the campaign. In the middle of 2007, the club appointed former German international defender and 1990 FIFA World Champion Guido Buchwald as manager trainer, who was fired after only 14 matches. After a short interim with Alemannia's Sportsmanger Jörg Schmadtke as headcoach, he was then replaced by Jürgen Seeberger, hardly known in Germany, in the winter break of the season.

The club suffered a rapid decline after its single Bundesliga season, being relegated from the 2. Bundesliga in 2012 and from the 3. Liga the season after. Alemannia consequently now plays in the tier four Regionalliga West.

Recent seasons

Bundesliga and 2. Bundesliga

3. Liga and Regionalliga West

Players
Current squad

HonoursBundesliga Runners-up: 1968–692. Bundesliga Runners-up: 2005–06Regionalliga West (II)
 Champions: 1964, 1966–67DFB-Pokal Runners-up: 1952–53, 1964–65, 2003–04Middle Rhine Cup''' (Tiers III-V)
 Winners: 1992–93, 1993–94, 1996–97, 1998–99, 2002, 2006, 2019

Notable playersPast (and present) players who are the subjects of Wikipedia articles can be found here.''

Belgium
  Roger Claessen

Bosnia and Herzegovina
  Ivica Grlić
  Denis Pozder 
Germany 
  Reinhold Münzenberg 
  Jupp Derwall
  Reinhold Yabo 
  Lewis Holtby 
  Marco Stiepermann
  Kai Havertz
  Torsten Frings
  David Odonkor
  Jan Schlaudraff

Netherlands
  Angelo Nijskens

Romania
  Ion Ionescu

Coaching history

Stadium

Alemannia Aachen used to play at the Old Tivoli which had a capacity of 21,632 spectators (3,632 seats). One of Germany's better known stadiums, it was built in 1928 and was renovated several times. The club played its 2004 UEFA Cup matches, however, in Cologne's RheinEnergieStadion in order to meet the stadium capacity requirements in place for the competition.

In August 2009 Aachen opened a new stadium, the New Tivoli, which has a capacity of 32,960 spectators (11,681 in standing areas).

References

External links

 Official club site

 
Football clubs in Germany
Football clubs in North Rhine-Westphalia
Association football clubs established in 1900
1900 establishments in Germany
Sport in Aachen
Bundesliga clubs
2. Bundesliga clubs
3. Liga clubs